Bindersee is a lake between the villages of Rollsdorf and Seeburg, in Landkreis Mansfeld-Südharz, Saxony-Anhalt, Germany.

Lakes of Saxony-Anhalt
LBindersee